The transmission system of electricity in Albania is run by the Transmission System Operator (OST), a public company with 100% state ownership. OST was created on 14 July 2004 as a result of the undergoing reforms within the Albanian Power Corporation. It was divided as a vertically organized company into three separate units with the functions of generating, transmitting and distributing of the electricity.

History

References

External links

Electric power transmission system operators in Albania
Electric power companies of Albania